Duygu Sakallı (born June 13, 1991) is a Turkish women's handballer, who plays in the Turkish Women's Handball Super League for Ardeşen GSK, and the Turkey national team. The -tall sportswoman plays in the left wing position.

Sakallı played for İzmir Büyükşehir Belediyesi GSK between 2010 and 2013. She transferred to  Genç Uşak SK in August 2014, and after one season to Ardeşen GSK in July 2015.

She took part at the Women's EHF Cup (2010–11) and Women's EHF Cup Winners' Cup (2011–12 , 2012–13 and 2015–16).

References 

1991 births
People from Urla, Izmir
Turkish female handball players
İzmir Büyükşehir Belediyespor handball players
Ardeşen GSK players
Turkey women's national handball players
Living people